Gurley may refer to:


People
 Gurley (surname)
 Gurley Brewer (1866–1919), African-American attorney, newspaper publisher and political activist

Places
Australia:
Gurley, New South Wales, a town

United States:
Gurley, Alabama, a town
Gurley, Louisiana, an unincorporated community
Gurley, Nebraska, a village
Gurley, Horry County, South Carolina

Businesses
Gurley Precision Instruments, an American manufacturing company
Gurley (automobile company), American automobile company (1899–1901)
Gurley Novelty, a defunct candle-making company

See also
W. & L. E. Gurley Building, the Gurley Precision Instruments's National Historic Landmark building